Senator Littell may refer to:

Alfred B. Littell (1893–1970), New Jersey State Senate
Robert E. Littell (1936–2014), New Jersey State Senate

See also
Senator Little (disambiguation)